This is a list of Romanian Inventions and Discoveries of Romanian people or inventors/discoverers of Romanian heritage in alphabetical order.

A
Ion I. Agârbiceanu: designer of the first gas laser in Romania.
Andrei Alexandrescu: pioneering work on policy-based design implemented via template metaprogramming; co-inventor of D programming language.
Ana Aslan: inventor of Gerovital, an anti-aging product widely used by famous personalities, such as Charles de Gaulle, John F. Kennedy, Indira Gandhi, Charlie Chaplin or Salvador Dalí.
Gheorghe Atanasiu: inventor of infrared monochromator and creator of the method of optical determination of heat of dissociation.
Ion Atanasiu: known as the originator of cerimetry, an analytical method based on cerium (IV) as titration reagent.

B

Aurel Babeș: discovered the vaginal smear as screening test for cervical cancer.
Victor Babeș: he discovered a parasitic sporozoan of the ticks, named Babesia (of the genus Babesiidae), and which causes a rare and severe disease called babesiosis; he also discovered cellular inclusions in rabies-infected nerve cells.
Emanoil Bacaloglu: he is known for the "Bacaloglu pseudosphere".  This is a surface of revolution for which the "Bacaloglu curvature" is constant.
Radu Bălescu: he worked on the statistical physics of charged particles (Bălescu-Lenard collision operator).
Alexandra Bellow: has made substantial contributions to the fields of ergodic theory, probability and analysis.
George de Bothezat: inventor of the quadrotor helicopter (The Flying Octopus). He is considered one of the founders of aircraft flight dynamics.
Ștefan Burileanu: inventor of the Burileanu antiaircraft cannon.

C

Ion Cantacuzino: his discoveries were relevant in the treatment of cholera, epidemic typhus, tuberculosis, and scarlet fever.
Elie Carafoli: a pioneering contributor to the field of aerodynamics.
Alexandru Ciurcu: invented alongside  the reaction engine.
Henri Coandă: aircraft designer, discovered the Coandă effect of fluidics.
George Constantinescu: founded the Theory of Sonics, based on which he developed a number of applications including a synchronization gear. He is also known as the inventor of a mechanical torque converter, he applied to an experimental automobile as automatic transmission.
Justin Capră: engineer and inventor; machines on which he worked included a jetpack, 72 fuel-efficient cars, 15 unconventional engines and seven aircraft, among others.

D
Carol Davila: invented the Davila tincture used for the treatment of cholera, an opioid-based oral solution in use for symptomatic management of diarrhea.
Anastase Dragomir: he invented the parachuted cell, a dischargeable chair from an aircraft or other vehicle, designed for emergency escapes, an early version of the modern ejection seat.

E
Lazăr Edeleanu: he was the first chemist to synthesize amphetamine.

F
Alexandru Froda: discovered Froda's theorem.

G
Mihai Gavrilă: theoretical quantum physicist, discoverer of atomic dichotomy in ultra-intense, high frequency laser fields.
Tudor Ganea: discovered the Eilenberg−Ganea conjecture.
Billy Gladstone: among his inventions is the "Ludwig Gladstone Cymbal”, a rare jazz instrument.
Rodrig Goliescu: he built the avioplan, the first fixed-wing aircraft with a tubular fuselage and the "Aviocoleopter", the first vertical take-off and landing aircraft.
Corneliu E. Giurgea: coined the term nootropics, after discovering Piracetam and describing it as such.

H

Spiru Haret: he made a fundamental contribution to the n-body problem in celestial mechanics by proving that using a third degree approximation for the disturbing forces implies instability of the major axes of the orbits, and by introducing the concept of secular perturbations in relation to this.
Horia Hulubei: he is the first physicist in the world to obtain X-ray spectra in gases. He has important contributions in neutron physics and in the study of nuclear reactions.

I
 Theodor V. Ionescu: the inventor of a multiple-cavity magnetron in 1935, a hydrogen maser in 1947, 3D imaging for cinema/television in 1924 and hot deuterium plasma studies for controlled nuclear fusion in 1969, member of the Romanian Academy since 1955.

L
Traian Lalescu: discovered the Lalescu sequence.
Constantin Levaditi: alongside Karl Landsteiner, he discovered in 1909 the presence of the polio virus in tissues other than nervous.

M
Preda Mihăilescu: known for his proof of Catalan's conjecture.
Meinhard E. Mayer: an early contributor to the theory of vector-bosons (W and Z bosons) and electro-weak unification, which later became the Standard model, and an early advocate of the use of fiber bundles in gauge theory.
Mina Minovici: famous for his extensive research regarding cadaverous alkaloids, putrefaction, simulated mind diseases, and criminal anthropology.
Grigore Moisil: discovered Łukasiewicz-Moisil algebras, and he was elected a Member of the Romanian Academy
Florentina I. Mosora: Romanian biophysicist who worked at first in the "Carol Davila" School of Medicine of the University of Bucharest, and subsequently in Belgium at the University of Liege;  specialized in Nuclear Medicine, she applied nuclear medicine techniques and invented new methodology for the clinical investigation of type 2 diabetes.

N

Mihai Nadin: he founded the world's first program in Computational Design.
Costin D. Nenițescu: he found new methods for the synthesis of pirilium salts, of carbenes, tryptamine, serotonin, two new syntheses for the indole nucleus, and a new method of polymerisation of ethylene.

O

Hermann Oberth: along with the Russian Konstantin Tsiolkovsky and the American Robert Goddard, one of the founding fathers of rocketry and astronautics.
Ștefan Odobleja: had supposedly established many of the major themes of cybernetics regarding cybernetics and systems thinking ten years before the work of Norbert Wiener was published in 1948.

P

George Emil Palade: discoverer of the ribosomes.
Nicolae Paulescu: physiologist, research on endocrine pancreas secretion.
Gheorghe Paun: prominent for work on membrane computing and the P system.
Eugen Pavel: inventor of the Hyper CD-ROM, a 3D optical data storage medium with a claimed initial capacity of 10 TB and with a theoretical capacity of 1 PB on a single disc.
Aurel Perșu: built the first car to have wheels inside its aerodynamic line.
Ion N. Petrovici: he described the Alternating Asphygmo-Pyramidal Syndrome in occlusions of the carotid arteries.
Petrache Poenaru: invented the world's first fountain pen.
Ioan Pușcaș: Prof. Dr. he proposed the use of carbonic anhydrase (CA) inhibitor acetazolamide to heal peptic ulcers. In 1972 patented the first 100% efficient drug against gastroduodenal ulcer Ulcosilvanil.
Dimitrie Pompeiu: his contributions were mainly in the field of mathematical analysis, complex functions theory, and rational mechanics. In an article published in 1929, he posed a challenging conjecture in integral geometry, now widely known as the Pompeiu problem.
Nicolae Popescu: known for his contributions to Algebra and the theory of abelian categories with applications to rings and modules.
Vasile M. Popov: he is well known for having developed a method to analyze stability of nonlinear dynamical systems, now known as Popov criterion.
Alexandru Proca: he formulated the first mesonic theory of nuclear forces, including the equations for the mesonic vector field that carry his name (Proca's equations), elected post-mortem as a Member of the Romanian Academy.
Ștefan Procopiu: he established the magnetic moment and determined the physical constant of magnetic moment, named magneton. The magneton is now known as the Bohr-Procopiu magneton.

R

Emil Racoviță: the founder of biospeleology.
Nicholas Georgescu-Roegen: introduced into economics, inter alia, the concept of entropy from thermodynamics.

S

Anghel Saligny: built the first silos in the world made of reinforced concrete.
Isaac Jacob Schoenberg: known for his discovery of splines.
Robert Steinberg: invented the Steinberg representation, the Steinberg group in algebraic K-theory, and the Steinberg groups in Lie theory that yield finite simple groups over finite fields.
Gabriel Sudan: known for the Sudan function, an important example in the theory of computation, similar to the Ackermann function.

T
Ion Tănăsescu: he discovered the Lehmstedt-Tanasescu reaction, which was improved by Karl Lehmstedt.
Victor Toma: Romanian inventor of the first Romanian computer-CIFA-1, built with his team in 1955.
Nicolae Teclu: invented the Teclu burner.
Șerban Țițeica: founder of Romanian school of theoretical physics, with major contributions in thermodynamics, statistical physics, quantum mechanics and atomic physics.

V

Aurel Vlaicu: built the first arrow-shaped airplane.
Valeria Văcărescu : mechanical engineer.
Gheorghe Vrânceanu: discovered the notion of non-holonomic spaces.
Traian Vuia: built the first fixed wing aircraft that could take off by its own power, in which he made a powered hop.

W

William F. Friedman: a cryptographer that invented the Index of Coincidence method (it broke Japan's PURPLE cipher for US forces).

See also
 Science and technology in Romania

External links
 Inventatori români 

Romanian
Inventors
Inventors
List